Wetterling is a surname. Notable people with the surname include:
 Jacob Wetterling (1978–1989), American murder victim
 Wetterling Act, a United States law named for Jacob
 Jessica Wetterling (born 1986), Swedish politician
Patty Wetterling (born 1949), American activist and politician

Surnames of Scandinavian origin